Olfactory receptor 52D1 is a protein that in humans is encoded by the OR52D1 gene.

Olfactory receptors interact with odorant molecules in the nose, to initiate a neuronal response that triggers the perception of a smell. The olfactory receptor proteins are members of a large family of G-protein-coupled receptors (GPCR) arising from single coding-exon genes. Olfactory receptors share a 7-transmembrane domain structure with many neurotransmitter and hormone receptors and are responsible for the recognition and G protein-mediated transduction of odorant signals. The olfactory receptor gene family is the largest in the genome. The nomenclature assigned to the olfactory receptor genes and proteins for this organism is independent of other organisms.

Ligands
Compared to other olfactory receptors such as OR1G1, OR52D1 has a more narrow/specific range of ligands.

Agonists:
 Methyl octanoate
 "Better activated by acids, aldehydes, ketones and esters than alcohols or pyrazines"

See also 
 Olfactory receptor

References

Further reading

External links 
 

Olfactory receptors